Ceratophyllidia papilligera (commonly referred to as the Black Spotted Nudibranch) is a species of sea slug, dorid nudibranch, shell-less marine gastropod mollusc in the family Phyllidiidae.

Description 
The maximum recorded body length is 30 mm.

Habitat 
Minimum recorded depth is 2 m. Maximum recorded depth is 185 m.

References

External links 
 
 http://www.seaslugforum.net/factsheet/cerapapi
 Valdés À. & Gosliner T. M. (1999). "Phylogeny of the radula-less dorids (Mollusca, Nudibranchia), with the description of a new genus and a new family". Zoologica Scripta 28: 315-360. .
 

Phyllidiidae
Gastropods described in 1890